The Men's 100 metre freestyle S1 swimming event at the 2004 Summer Paralympics was competed on 21 September. It was won by Izhak Mamistvalov, representing .

Final round

21 Sept. 2004, evening session

References

M